Joshua Carl Revak (born January 21, 1981) is an American politician who has served as a member of the Alaska Senate since November 2, 2019. Originally elected to the Alaska House of Representatives in 2018, Revak was appointed to the Senate to replace Chris Birch, whom he replaced in the House, when Birch died suddenly in August 2019.

Early life
Revak was born and raised on a farm in Minnesota. He enlisted in the United States Army shortly after the September 11 attacks. After being severely wounded by a mortar attack in Iraq, Revak and was honorably discharged in 2008 and returned to Minnesota.

Career
In 2009, Revak moved to Alaska, where he worked in the office of Congressman Don Young, serving as his military and veterans affairs liaison and political advisor. During this time, he earned a Master of Business Administration from Alaska Pacific University. In 2018, Revak was elected to serve in the Alaska House of Representatives to represent the 25th district. After the death of incumbent Chris Birch in 2019, Revak was nominated by Governor Mike Dunleavy to fill his vacant seat in the Alaska Senate.

References

1981 births
21st-century American politicians
Alaska Pacific University alumni
Candidates in the 2022 United States House of Representatives elections
Republican Party Alaska state senators
Living people
Republican Party members of the Alaska House of Representatives
Military personnel from Minnesota
People from Anchorage, Alaska
People from Two Harbors, Minnesota
United States Army personnel of the Iraq War